Mont Chapman (elevation ) is the highest peak in the Stoke Mountains of the southern Notre Dame mountain range located in Stoke, Quebec, Canada. It is accessible from trails maintained by Les Sentiers de l'Estrie. From the summit, one is able to see Mont Ham, Mont Ste-Cécile, and Mont Mégantic. Neighboring Bald Peak (elevation approx.) is accessible by these same trails.

References

External links
 Les Sentiers de l'Estrie inc.
 Peakbagger.com page

Landforms of Estrie
Chapman
Tourist attractions in Estrie